Podleś is a PKP railway station in Nowy Podleś (Pomeranian Voivodeship), Poland.

Lines crossing the station

References 
Podleś article at Polish Stations Database, URL accessed at 6 March 2006

Railway stations in Pomeranian Voivodeship
Kościerzyna County